Tuufuli Uperesa (January 20, 1948 – June 21, 2021) was an American football guard who played one season with the Philadelphia Eagles of the National Football League (NFL). He was drafted by the Eagles in the sixteenth round of the 1970 NFL Draft. He played college football at the University of Montana and attended ʻAiea High School in Aiea, Hawaii. Uperesa was also a member of the Winnipeg Blue Bombers, Calgary Stampeders, Ottawa Rough Riders  and BC Lions of the Canadian Football League.

He died of kidney failure on June 21, 2021, in American Samoa at age 73.

References

External links
Just Sports Stats

1948 births
2021 deaths
Players of American football from American Samoa
Players of American football from Hawaii
American football offensive linemen
American sportspeople of Samoan descent
Canadian football offensive linemen
Montana Grizzlies football players
Philadelphia Eagles players
Winnipeg Blue Bombers players
Calgary Stampeders players
Ottawa Rough Riders players
BC Lions players
People from Oahu
Deaths from kidney failure